Tsegay or Tsegaye is a male name of Ethiopian origin that may refer to:

Given name
Tsegaye Degineh (born 1969), Ethiopian martial arts advocate
Tsegaye Gabre-Medhin (1936–2006), Ethiopian writer and Poet Laureate

Surname
Atsedu Tsegay (born 1991), Ethiopian long-distance runner specialising in the half marathon
Genet Tsegay (born 1992), Ethiopian beauty pageant contestant
Gudaf Tsegay (born 1997), Ethiopian middle-distance runner
Marcus Velado-Tsegaye (born 2001), Canadian soccer player
Michael Tsegaye (born 1979), Ethiopian artist and photographer
Samuel Tsegay (born 1988), Eritrean long-distance runner specialising in the 5000 metres and 10,000 metres
Tirfi Tsegaye (born 1984), Ethiopian long-distance runner specialising in the marathon
Yemane Tsegay (born 1985), Ethiopian long distance runner specialising in the marathon

Ethiopian given names
Amharic-language names